Old Town is an historic neighborhood of College Park, Maryland.  It is roughly bounded by the University of Maryland campus, the B&O Railroad tracks, and US Route 1.  The area was plotted out in 1889, and built out over the next several decades, its developers seeking to attract commuters to Baltimore and Washington, DC, and individuals affiliated with the Maryland Agricultural College (as the school was then known).  Most of the neighborhood is residential, with American Foursquare and Cape Cod style housing predominating.  Closer to the university campus, the developers built garden-style apartment houses and other types of housing to cater to the academic community.  The major non-residential structures are a Gothic Revival church, a modern post office and Washington Metro station.

The neighborhood was listed on the National Register of Historic Places in 2012.

Due to the close proximity of Old Town to campus, many fraternity and sorority chapters from University of Maryland own houses in this neighborhood.

References

External links
, including undated photo, at Maryland Historical Trust website
Boundary Map of the Old Town College Park Historic District, Prince George's County, at Maryland Historical Trust

Historic districts in Prince George's County, Maryland
Queen Anne architecture in Maryland
Houses on the National Register of Historic Places in Maryland
Houses in Prince George's County, Maryland
Historic districts on the National Register of Historic Places in Maryland
National Register of Historic Places in Prince George's County, Maryland